Dorcadion songaricum is a species of beetle in the family Cerambycidae. It was described by Ludwig Ganglbauer in 1883. It is known from China and Kazakhstan.

See also 
 Dorcadion

References

sonjae
Beetles described in 1883